Shivalaya (Shibaloy, meaning "Home of Shiva") is an upazila of Manikganj District in the Division of Dhaka, Bangladesh.

Geography
It has 26334 households and total area 199.07 km2.

Demographics
As of the 1991 Bangladesh census, Shivalaya has a population of 143842. Males constitute 52.42% of the population, and females 47.58%. This Upazila's eighteen up population is 75930. Shivalaya has an average literacy rate of 29.1% (7+ years), and the national average of 32.4% literate.

Administration
Shivalaya Upazila is divided into seven union parishads: Aruoa, Mohadebpur, Shibaloy, Simulia, Teota, Ulayel, and Uthali. The union parishads are subdivided into 202 mauzas and 255 villages.

Education
|
College:-
 Sadar Uddin Degree College
 Mahadebpur Union Degree College, Barangail
|
High School:-
 Shibalaya govt. High school
 Barangail G.C. High School
 Maloci High school
 Bajpara High School
 Uthali AGS High school

Primary School:-
 Oxford Academy, Shibalaya
 Barangail Govt. Primary School

See also
 Upazilas of Bangladesh
 Districts of Bangladesh
 Divisions of Bangladesh

References

 
Upazilas of Manikganj District